Jonathan Paul Michael Chaffey,  (born 1962) is a British Church of England priest and former military chaplain, who served with the Royal Air Force. He serves as Archdeacon of Oxford in the same diocese; from 2014 to 2018 he served as the Chaplain-in-Chief and head of the Royal Air Force Chaplains Branch. He previously served as Deputy Chaplain-in-Chief.

Early life
Chaffey was born in 1962 in London, England. He was educated at Worksop College, a private school in Worksop, Nottinghamshire. He studied at St Chad's College, Durham, graduating with a Bachelor of Arts (BA) degree in 1983. In 1984, he entered Cranmer Hall, Durham, an Anglican theological college attached to St John's College, Durham, to train for ordained ministry.

Ordained ministry
Chaffey was ordained in the Church of England as a deacon in 1987 and as a priest in 1988. Before joining the military, he served his curacy at St Stephen's Church, Gateacre in the Diocese of Liverpool.

Military career
On 20 May 1990, Chaffey was commissioned into the Chaplains Branch, Royal Air Force and granted the relative rank of flight lieutenant. His first posting was to RAF Lyneham. On 20 May 1991, he was promoted to the relative rank of squadron leader. He transferred from a short service commission to a permanent commission on 17 November 1993. During his early career he served as a chaplain at RAF Stafford, RAF Finningley, RAF Wittering, RAF Waddington and RAF Lossiemouth. He also completed overseas deployments to RAF Gibraltar, the Falkland Islands, Al Udeid Air Base in Qatar and Gioia del Colle Air Base in Italy.

On 1 July 2003, as part of the half-yearly promotions, Chaffey was promoted to the relative rank of wing commander. From 2004 to 2007, he served as the Staff Chaplain at Royal Air Force College Cranwell. In addition to being the senior chaplain, he also taught the Beliefs and Values Programme and the Care in Leadership Course. He was then posted to HQ Chaplaincy Services in a training role. During this time he also completed two postings to Afghanistan as part of Operation Herrick. On 1 January 2010, he was granted the relative rank of group captain. He was then appointed the Deputy Chaplain-in-Chief.

In 2013, Chaffey began his attendance of the Royal College of Defence Studies. In July 2014, he succeeded Ray Pentland as the Chaplain-in-Chief and head of the Royal Air Force Chaplains Branch. He was promoted to the relative rank of air vice-marshal on 25 July 2014. Chaffey was appointed a Companion of the Order of the Bath in the 2018 New Year Honours. He retired from the Royal Air Force in July 2018.

Later ministry
On 29 January 2020, it was announced that Chaffey would be the next Archdeacon of Oxford in the Diocese of Oxford: he was due to be licensed as archdeacon during a service at Christ Church Cathedral, Oxford on 9 May 2020. But, due to the COVID-19 pandemic, was instead collated online on 1 May 2020.

Personal life
Chaffey is married to Jane, who is also a priest. Together, they have three daughters.

References

1962 births
20th-century English Anglican priests
21st-century English Anglican priests
Alumni of Cranmer Hall, Durham
Alumni of St Chad's College, Durham
Church of England archdeacons (military)
Companions of the Order of the Bath
Living people
Royal Air Force Chaplains-in-Chief
Royal Air Force personnel of the War in Afghanistan (2001–2021)
Archdeacons of Oxford